Peach sauce is used as an accompaniment in Chinese cuisine and other cuisines. It is also used in peach preserves and chutney.

Peach sauce may be used as a dessert sauce as a topping for pancakes, and also on savory dishes, such as grilled chicken, coconut shrimp and pork.

See also 
 List of Chinese sauces

References 

Sauces
Chinese sauces